Mont Saint-Michel is a hill, 437 metres high, in the Vosges mountains in the French region of Alsace. It rises above the town and abbey of Saint-Jean-Saverne (St. Johann bei Zabern). It is home to a St. Michael's Shrine like its more famous cousin in Normandy, but historically is not related to it.

Literature 

 Jean-Joseph Ring: Promenades historiques et archéologiques autour de Saverne. Saverne, 2000, 

Mountains of Bas-Rhin
Peaks dedicated to Michael (archangel)